Hari Ng Sablay (or Hari Ng Sablay: Isang Tama, Sampung Mali) is a 2005 Filipino-language Filipino comedy film directed by Mac Alejandre and starring Rica Peralejo, Bearwin Meily and Nadine Samonte.
  The film was referred to as a "box office hit" when earning  after its nationwide release, and has been called a "heart-wrenching hit".

Plot
Mars (Bearwin Meily) is a seemingly unlucky man. But fate says that when a woman named Venus (Rica Peralejo) meets him, his bad luck subsides. But they have their own lives and problems to do. Mars is just so unlucky, while Venus is a successful businesswoman.

Cast

 Bearwin Meily as Mars
 Rica Peralejo as Venus
 Joel Torre as Rodel
 Al Tantay as Benjou
 Nova Villa as Lola Gracia
 Jay-R as Adonis
 Tuesday Vargas as Maritess
 Nadine Samonte as Mindy
 Mike 'Pekto' Nacua as Bok
 Bianca King as Monica
 Dion Ignacio as Billie
 Nash Aguas as Jayjay
 Louie Anderson as Krizzy
 Jade Lopez as Maggie
 Paolo Contis as Popoy
 Ella Guevara as Young Venus
 Chris Martin as Jojo
 Miguel Tanfelix as Young Mars
 Basty Alcances as Young Popoy
 Renz Joyce Juan as Young Maritess
 Jorel Tan as Siokoy
 Renee Summer as Kampanerang Kuba
 Krizzy Jareno as Krizzy
 Carlito Campos as Mike Enriquez
 Paolo Paraiso as Greg
 Pinky Marquez as Manang
 J.R. Valentin as Dennis
 Harvey Diez as Chinese Businessman

Reception

References

External links
 
  as archived May 27, 2008

2005 films
2005 romantic comedy films
Regal Entertainment films
Filipino-language films
2000s Tagalog-language films
Philippine romantic comedy films
2000s English-language films
Films directed by Mac Alejandre